The 1981–82 La Liga season, the 51st since its establishment, started on 19 September 1981, and finished on 25 April 1982. It was composed of the following clubs:

Teams

League table

Results table

Top goalscorers

La Liga seasons
1981–82 in Spanish football leagues
Spain